No. 626 Squadron RAF was a heavy bomber squadron of the Royal Air Force from 1943 to 1945.

History

The squadron was formed on 7 November 1943 at RAF Wickenby from C Flight of No. 12 Squadron. It operated in the strategic bombing role with the Avro Lancaster. It was disbanded on 14 October 1945, having spent the last months of the war on food droppings (Operation Manna) and transport duties (Operation Exodus), repatriating former prisoners of war and bringing British troops home from Italy.

First operational mission
10/11 November 1943
 7 Lancasters bombed Modane

Last operational mission
25 April 1945
 14 Lancasters bombed Obersalzberg

Last mission before V.E. day
7 May 1945
 19 Lancasters dropped supplies to the Dutch in Rotterdam

The squadron flew 2,728 sorties during the Second World War for the loss of 49 aircraft.

Aircraft operated

Squadron bases

Notable personnel
 Michael Bentine – Intelligence Officer
 Colin Tapley – Flying Control Officer
 Eric Simms – bomb-aimer
 Jack Currie, Lancaster (later Mosquito) pilot, writer, broadcaster and artist

 Stewart Jacques - Flight Sergeant

See also
List of Royal Air Force aircraft squadrons

References

Notes

Bibliography

Further reading
 Currie, Jack. Lancaster Target: The Story of a Crew Who Flew from Wickenby. Goodall Publications Ltd., 1997. .
 Smith, Ron. Rear Gunner Pathfinder. Manchester, UK: Goodall Publications Ltd./Crécy, 1998. .
 Ward, Cris. Royal Air Force Bomber Command Squadron Profiles, Number 122: 626 Squadron, "To Strive and Not to Yield". Berkshire, UK: Ward Publishing, 1998.
 West, Dennis. To Strive and Not to Yield: No. 626 Squadron and the Battle of Berlin . Woodfield Publishing, 2002. .

External links
 Tom Bint – 626 Squadron & RAF Wickenby
 626 Squadron on RAF website
 History of No.'s 621–650 Squadrons at RAF Web

Bomber squadrons of the Royal Air Force in World War II
626
Military units and formations established in 1943
Military units and formations disestablished in 1945